Kentucky Route 81 is a 39.961-mile (64.331 km) state highway in Kentucky that runs from U.S. Route 431 in South Carrollton to Kentucky Route 2831 and Kentucky Route 81 in Owensboro via Bremen, Sacramento, Rumsey, and Calhoun.

Major intersections

References

0081
Transportation in Muhlenberg County, Kentucky
Transportation in McLean County, Kentucky
Transportation in Daviess County, Kentucky